This list contains all of the Pyrenean three-thousanders, namely the 129 mountain summits of  or more above sea level in the Pyrenees, a range of mountains in southwest Europe that forms a natural border between France and Spain.

The summits meeting the 3,000-metre criterion were defined by a UIAA-sponsored joint Franco-Spanish team led by Juan Buyse. The UIAA list, published in 1990, also contains 83 secondary summits in addition to the 129 principal ones listed here, and divides the range into 11 zones. According to the latest surveys, three of the peaks in the original list are actually below 3000m but are still included below. 

The selection criteria used here are quite broad – many of the peaks included are secondary summits of major mountains. Using prominence as a criterion, only one summit is an ultra-prominent peak, Aneto, a further three have a prominence of 1000m (Pico Posets, Pica d'Estats, Vignemale), and five more have a prominence of over 600m. Only 17 in total have a prominence of more than 300m, commonly used as a criterion for determining an independent mountain, and are indicated in bold in the table below. 28 more have a prominence of over 100m and can be considered significant summits.

All the peaks in this list are in Spain (59 peaks) or France (26 peaks), or delimit the border between the two countries (45). The two highest major mountains and their subsidiary summits (Aneto and Posets - Zone 7 and 9) are entirely in Spain, together with the Besiberri peaks (zone 10) while Pic Long and surrounding mountains (zone 5) are entirely in France. Most of the other mountains lie on or close to the border. The small country of Andorra is located in the eastern portion of the Pyrenees and is surrounded by Spain and France; its highest mountain – Coma Pedrosa at  – falls below the 3,000-metre threshold. The mountains are listed by height within each of the 11 zones.

Table (incomplete) of Pyrenean 3000m summits 
For the complete list see: Pyrenees#Highest summits

Zone 1 : Balaïtous-Enfer-Argualas

Zone 2 : Vignemale

Zone 3 : Monte Perdido

Zone 4 : La Munia

Zone 5 : Néouvielle-Pic Long

Zone 6 : Batoua-Batchimale

Zone 7 : Posets-Eristé

Zone 8 : Clarabide-Perdiguero-Boum

Zone 9 : Maladeta-Aneto

Zone 10 : Besiberris

Zone 11 : Estats-Montcalm

See also
 Three-thousanders
 List of mountains in Aragon
 List of mountains in Catalonia
 Peak bagging

References

External links
 All of the summits – including secondary summits – contained in the Buyse list (in French)

Bibliography 
 

Pyrenees, three-thousanders
Pyrenees